The International Institute of New England is a United States non-profit organization serving immigrants, refugees, asylees, and other vulnerable populations in the Boston area.  Affiliate branches are located in Lowell, Massachusetts, and Manchester, New Hampshire. In 2017, the IINE assisted nearly 2,000 people from more than 60 different countries, including, but not limited to, Burma, Bhutan, Iraq, Somalia, Syria, and the Democratic Republic of Congo. 

The International Institute of New England (IINE) was founded in 1918 in Lowell, Massachusetts. Today, it is a non-profit organization funded by private grants, public grants and contracts, and individual donations.  The organization's key services include: resettlement and humanitarian relief, English language learning, employment, skills training, and legal forms services. 

Refugees resettled by the US government via the Massachusetts Office for Refugees and Immigrants may be assigned to IINE, which has helped establish immigrant communities in Dorchester, East Boston, Roxbury, Chelsea, Everett, Lynn, and numerous other Greater Boston and New Hampshire regions. Today, there are many International Institutes operating independently across the United States, each serving their own respective refugee and immigrant populations. 

The International Institute of New England is staffed by  70 employees who speak more than a dozen languages. Its mission is to help refugees and immigrants acclimate to and actively participate in the economic, social, and political richness of American life. The organization is headed by its President and CEO Jeffrey Thielman and overseen by a Board of Directors. The IINE funded by federal, state, and local grants and contracts, foundation awards, and private donations.

External links
International Institute of New England Website

Non-profit organizations based in Boston
Massachusetts society